Silk amino acid (SAAs) also known as Sericin is a natural water-soluble glycoprotein extracted from raw silk. It is used as an additive in skin and hair care products due to its high levels of serine which has excellent moisture preservation characteristics. As a water-based additive it is used to provide a protective barrier and silky feel to lotions, soaps, personal lubricants, hair and skincare products. Silk amino acids are produced by hydrolyzing (or breaking apart) silk proteins into smaller peptide chains, typically 18 to 19 amino acids in length. Silk amino acids have a lower molecular weight than silk protein powders and are moisturizing to skin and hair.

Silk amino acids are used in formulating shampoos, conditioner, hair treatments, bodywash, body lotions, cleansers, toners and facial moisturizers, mascara, lipstick and color cosmetics.

Background
Silk is made up of two primary proteins; a fibrous protein known as fibroin, and a sticky protein known as sericin, with the two comprising 70–80% and 20–30% of silk, respectively.  Both of these proteins provide the unique functionality of silk that makes silk clothes so unique and so popular, with the production of silk material dating back to as early as 3500 BC. What is not so well known though is that silk has been used in traditional medicine in both China and Korea for centuries. The source of these silk amino acids is typically the domesticated moth, silkworm (Latin name: Bombyx mori).

Sericin has a high hydroxy amino acid content which is important for the water-binding capacity which regulates the skin's moisture content. It also has a unique carbohydrate moiety and a unique repetitive amino acid sequence which give it a high affinity for bonding to adhering proteins resulting in a tightening, anti-wrinkle effect. In addition, because of its high molecular weight, it leaves a substantive semi-occlusive film that persists even after washing, and can increase the skins permeability.

Composition
Predominant composition of silk amino acids (by weight*):
 L-Alanine (34.36%)
 Glycine (27.23%)
 L-Serine (9.58%)
 L-Valine (3.49%)
 L-Threonine (2.00%)
 [*SAAs contains other amino acids but only those representing >2.00% are listed due to their greater relevance]

Applications
Due to its proteinous nature, sericin is susceptible to the action of proteolytic enzymes, making it digestible; and because of properties like its gelling ability, moisture retention capacity and skin adhesion, it has numerous medical, pharmaceutical and cosmetic applications.

References

Amino acid derivatives